The 50th Ohio Infantry Regiment was an infantry regiment in the Union Army during the American Civil War.

Service
The 50th Ohio Infantry Regiment was organized at Camp Dennison near Cincinnati, Ohio and mustered in for three years service on August 27, 1862, under the command of Colonel J. R. Taylor.  The regiment was recruited in Allen, Auglaize, Belmont, Hamilton, Preble, Putnam, Shelby, Tuscarawas, and Van Wert counties.  On December 31, 1864, the 99th Ohio Infantry was consolidated into the 50th Ohio Infantry.

The regiment was attached to 34th Brigade, 10th Division, Army of the Ohio, September 1862. 34th Brigade, 10th Division, I Corps, Army of the Ohio, to November 1862. District of West Kentucky, Department of the Ohio, to May 1863. Unattached, 2nd Division, XXIII Corps, Department of the Ohio, to August 1863. Unattached, 1st Division, XXIII Corps, to September 1863. District of South Central Kentucky, 1st Division, XXIII Corps, to April 1864. 3rd Brigade, 4th Division, XXIII Corps, to June 1864. 3rd Brigade, 2nd Division, XXIII Corps, Army of the Ohio, to February 1865, and Department of North Carolina to June 1865.

The 50th Ohio Infantry mustered out of service at Salisbury, North Carolina, on June 26, 1865.

Detailed service
Ordered to Covington, Ky., September 1. Defense of Cincinnati, Ohio, against Kirby Smith's threatened attack. Moved to Louisville, Ky., September 20. Pursuit of Bragg into Kentucky October 1–15. Battle of Perryville, Ky., October 8. Moved to Lebanon, Ky., and duty there until February 1863. At Muldraugh's Hill, Ky., building fortifications and bridges over Sulphur and Rolling Forks of Green River until September. Also built Forts Boyle, Sands and McAllister. Ordered to Nashville, Tenn., September 18; thence to Gallatin, Tenn., and to Glasgow, Ky., and to Knoxville, Tenn., December 25. March across mountains to Jacksboro December 26, 1863, to January 7, 1864. Duty there until February 22. At Knoxville and Loudoun until May. Moved to Cleveland, Tenn., thence march to Kingston, Ga., and joined Sherman's army May 23, 1864. Atlanta Campaign May 23-September 8. Kingston May 24. Operations on line of Pumpkin Vine creek and battles about Dallas, New Hope Church and Allatoona Hills May 25-June 5. Operations about Marietta and against Kennesaw Mountain June 10-July 2. Pine Hill June 11–14. Lost Mountain June 15–17. Muddy Creek June 17. Noyes Creek June 19. Kolb's Farm June 22. Assault on Kennesaw June 27. Nickajack Creek July 2–5. Chattahoochie River July 6–17. Decatur July 19. Howard House, Atlanta, July 20. Siege of Atlanta July 22-August 25. Utoy Creek August 5–7. Flank movement on Jonesboro August 25–30. Battle of Jonesboro August 31-September 1. Lovejoy's Station September 2–6. Camp at Decatur until October 4. Pursuit of Hood into Alabama October 4–26. Nashville Campaign November–December. Columbia, Duck River, November 24–27. Columbia Ford November 28–29. Battle of Franklin November 30. Battle of Nashville December 15–16. Pursuit of Hood to the Tennessee River December 17–28. Moved to Clifton, Tenn., and duty there until January 16, 1865. Movement to Washington, D.C., thence to Smithville, N. C., January 16-February 10. Operations against Hoke February 12–14. Fort Anderson February 18–19. Town Creek February 19–20. Capture of Wilmington February 22. Campaign of the Carolinas March 1-April 26. Advance on Goldsboro, N. C., March 6–21. Occupation of Goldsboro and Raleigh. Bennett's House April 26. Surrender of Johnston and his army. Duty at Raleigh until May 5, and Greensboro and Salisbury until June.

Casualties
The regiment lost a total of 210 men during service; 6 officers and 70 enlisted men killed or mortally wounded, 134 enlisted men died of disease.

Commanders
 Colonel J. R. Taylor - resigned
 Colonel Silas A. Strickland - commanded at the battle of Perryville as lieutenant colonel after Col. Taylor hid from enemy fire
 Lieutenant Colonel Hamilton S. Gillespie - commanded at the battle of Nashville

See also

 List of Ohio Civil War units
 Ohio in the Civil War

References
 Dyer, Frederick H. A Compendium of the War of the Rebellion (Des Moines, IA:  Dyer Pub. Co.), 1908.
 Ohio Roster Commission. Official Roster of the Soldiers of the State of Ohio in the War on the Rebellion, 1861–1865, Compiled Under the Direction of the Roster Commission (Akron, OH: Werner Co.), 1886–1895.
 Reid, Whitelaw. Ohio in the War: Her Statesmen, Her Generals, and Soldiers (Cincinnati, OH: Moore, Wilstach, & Baldwin), 1868. 
 Theaker, James G.  Through One Man's Eyes: The Civil war Experiences of a Belmont County Volunteer (Mount Vernon, OH:  Printing Arts Press, Inc.), 1974.
 Thoburn, Thomas Crawford.  My Experiences During the Civil War (Cleveland, OH:  s.n.), 1963.
 Winters, Erastus.  In the 50th Ohio Serving Uncle Sam: Memoirs of One Who Wore the Blue (East Walnut Hills, OH:  s.n.), 1905.
Attribution

External links
 Ohio in the Civil War: 50th Ohio Volunteer Infantry by Larry Stevens
 National flag of the 50th Ohio Infantry

Military units and formations established in 1862
Military units and formations disestablished in 1865
Units and formations of the Union Army from Ohio
1862 establishments in Ohio